Dragomir Stojanović (17 August 1878 – 20 June 1943) was a Serbian military officer and a Yugoslav army general, who served as the Minister of the Army and Navy of the Kingdom of Yugoslavia from 24 April 1931 to 18 April 1934.

References

1878 births
1943 deaths
People from the Principality of Serbia
People from Knjaževac
Serbian military personnel of the Balkan Wars
Serbian military personnel of World War I
Royal Yugoslav Army personnel of World War II
Army general (Kingdom of Yugoslavia)